The 2001 EAP Under-19 Cricket Trophy was a cricket tournament held in Fiji from 19–25 August 2001, during the 2001 international season. All matches were held in Nadi.

Papua New Guinea won the tournament by defeating Hong Kong in the final, thus qualifying for the 2002 Under-19 World Cup in New Zealand. Two PNG players, Frank Joseph and Greg Baeau, led the tournament in runs and wickets, respectively. The only century at the tournament was scored by a Fijian, Colin Rika.

The tournament, featuring only three teams, was organised by ICC East Asia-Pacific (EAP), and was the inaugural edition of the EAP Under-19 Trophy. Previously, EAP teams had had to qualify via the Youth Asia Cup, an Asian Cricket Council (ACC) tournament. For the next two World Cups, in 2004 and 2006, the EAP organised joint qualification tournaments with the African Cricket Association, held in 2003 and 2005. Separate qualifying tournaments have been held since then.

Teams and qualification 
Hong Kong, an Asian Cricket Council (ACC) member, participated in the tournament for the first and only time.

Round-robin

Full fixtures: Cricket Archive

Final

Statistics

Most runs
The top five run scorers are included in this table, ranked by runs scored and then by batting average.

Source: CricketArchive

Most wickets

The top five wicket takers are listed in this table, ranked by wickets taken and then by bowling average.

Source: CricketArchive

References 

Under-19 regional cricket tournaments
International cricket competitions in Fiji
International cricket competitions in 2001
2001 in Fijian sport
International sports competitions hosted by Fiji
Ba Province